Els Vandesteene (born 30 May 1987) is a Belgian female volleyball player. She is a member of the Belgium women's national volleyball team and played for Volley-Ball Nantes in 2014. She was part of the Belgian national team at the 2014 FIVB Volleyball Women's World Championship in Italy.

Clubs
  VDK Gent Dames (2002–2012)
  VT Aurubis Hamburg (2012–2013)
  Volley-Ball Nantes (2013–2016)

References

External links
 
 

1987 births
Living people
Belgian women's volleyball players
Place of birth missing (living people)
Volleyball players at the 2015 European Games
European Games competitors for Belgium
Wing spikers
21st-century Belgian women